Ocoee Dam Number 1 is a hydroelectric dam on the Ocoee River in Polk County in the U.S. state of Tennessee.  The dam impounds the  Parksville Reservoir (often called Ocoee Lake), and is the farthest downstream of four dams on the Toccoa/Ocoee River owned and operated by the Tennessee Valley Authority.  Completed in 1911, Ocoee No. 1 was one of the first hydroelectric projects in Tennessee.

Location
The Ocoee Scenic Byway— part of U.S. Route 64— passes just north of the dam. Parksville Lake extends for several miles eastward up the Ocoee and several miles southward up Baker Creek, which once emptied into the Ocoee just upstream from the dam.

Capacity

History

In 1910, the C.M. Clark Company, an electrical transportation holding firm, formed the Eastern Tennessee Power Company to build two hydroelectric dams on the Ocoee, and market their electricity output primarily to Chattanooga. Work on Ocoee Dam No. 1 began later that year, and was completed in late December 1911. On January 27, 1912, Ocoee Dam No. 1's four units began commercial operation. A fifth unit was added in 1914. The five units provided a total capacity of 18 MW. Power was distributed primarily to Chattanooga, and also to Knoxville, Nashville, and Rome, Georgia, as well as the aluminum industries in Alcoa.
A coal burning station known as the Parksville Steam Plant was built adjacent to the dam in 1916 to provide generation during periods of low water flow. It was last used in 1954.

In 1922, the Eastern Tennessee Power Company and several other entities merged to form the Tennessee Electric Power Company (TEPCO), which overhauled Ocoee No. 1 in the 1930s.  In 1933, the TVA Act created the Tennessee Valley Authority and gave the Authority oversight of the Tennessee River watershed, which includes the Ocoee River.  The head of TEPCO, Jo Conn Guild, was vehemently opposed to the creation of TVA, and with the help of attorney Wendell Willkie, challenged the constitutionality of the TVA Act in federal court.  The U.S. Supreme Court upheld the TVA Act, however, in its 1939 decision Tennessee Electric Power Company v. TVA.  On August 16, 1939, TEPCO was forced to sell its assets to TVA for $78 million (equivalent to $ in ), which included $2.68 million (equivalent to $ in ) for Ocoee Dam No. 1.

References

External links

Parksville Reservoir — official TVA site

1911 establishments in Tennessee
Buildings and structures in Polk County, Tennessee
Dams completed in 1911
Dams in Tennessee
Dams on the National Register of Historic Places in Tennessee
Energy infrastructure completed in 1911
Historic districts on the National Register of Historic Places in Tennessee
Dams on the Hiwassee River
Hydroelectric power plants in Tennessee
Tennessee Valley Authority dams
National Register of Historic Places in Polk County, Tennessee